The Nasa Kiwe National Corporation for the Reconstruction of the Páez River Basin and its Surrounding Areas, or Nasa Kiwe Corporation (CNK), is a relief agency of the Government of Colombia created after the 1994 Páez River earthquake and its following aftermath, to help the victims and the affected communities of the Paez River basin area and to finance reconstruction projects.

References

Government agencies established in 1994
Ministry of the Interior (Colombia)